Bocanegra may refer to;

Bocanegra (surname)
SEAT 1200 Sport, a 1970s car popularly nicknamed Bocanegra
SEAT Bocanegra, a 2008 concept car meant to recapture the spirit of the previous car